Nutrient agar is a general purpose liquid medium supporting growth of a wide range of non-fastidious organisms. It typically contains (mass/volume):
 0.5% peptone - this provides organic nitrogen
 0.3% beef extract/yeast extract - the water-soluble content of these contribute vitamins, carbohydrates, nitrogen, and salts
 1.5% agar - this gives the mixture solidity 
 0.5% sodium chloride - this gives the mixture proportions similar to those found in the cytoplasm of most organisms
 distilled water - water serves as a transport medium for the agar's various substances

Nutrient broth has the same composition,but lacks agar.

Once the dishes hold solidified agar, they are stored upside down and are often refrigerated until used. Inoculation takes place on warm dishes rather than cool ones: if refrigerated for storage, the dishes must be rewarmed to room temperature prior to inoculation.

See also
Plate count agar
Bacteria
Bacterial growth

References

Further reading
Lapage S., Shelton J. and Mitchell T., 1970, Methods in Microbiology', Norris J. and Ribbons D., (Eds.), Vol. 3A, Academic Press, London.
MacFaddin J. F., 2000, Biochemical Tests for Identification of Medical Bacteria, 3rd Ed., Lippincott, Williams and Wilkins, Baltimore.
Downes F. P. and Ito K., (Ed.), 2001, Compendium of Methods for the Microbiological Examination of Foods, 4th Ed., American Public Health Association, Washington, D.C.
American Public Health Association, Standard Methods for the Examination of Dairy Products, 1978, 14th Ed., Washington D.C.

Microbiological media